Al Sharq (Arabic; الشرق; The Orient) is an Arabic pro-government daily newspaper published in Doha, Qatar. The paper is one of the three leading Arabic newspapers in the country in addition to Al Raya and Al Watan.

History and profile
Al Sharq was launched in 1987 and was published by Al Watan Printing and Publishing House under the name of Al Khaleej Al Youm (Arabic: Gulf Today). Eighteen months after its start it was sold to Dar Al Sharq, and the paper was renamed as Al Sharq. The publisher of the paper which is led by a member of the ruling family, Al Thani, Khalid bin Thani Al Thani, also own the English daily The Peninsula and Arabic women's magazine Sayyidat Al Sharq.

Al Sharq is based in Doha. As of 2012 the editor and manager of Al Sharq was Abdul Latif Al Mahmoud. Jaber Al Harami was the editor-in-chief in 2016.

In 1996 Al Sharq started a page on the environmental issues. However, it was ended soon. Then the daily began to publish random articles and reports on environmental topics. In addition, it has large supplements on sports, business and finance. Since June 2012 the daily has offered a monthly supplement which is developed by Anadolu Agency's Middle East and Africa regional directorate.

In 2011 Al Sharq was one of the 50 most powerful online Arab newspapers in the list of Forbes.

The circulation of Al Sharq was about 10,000 in the early 1990s. In 2000 the paper reached a circulation of 47,000 circulation. Its estimated circulation in 2003 was 15,000 copies. In 2008 the daily also sold 15,000 copies.

Political stance and content
Al Sharq has a pro-government political stance although it is owned by a private company, Dar Al Sharq. It mostly provides news about the meetings and activities of the ruling family, Al Thani, and government officials. However, in 2008 a Jordanian journalist working for the daily was sentenced to three-year imprisonment due to her article in which she criticized Hamad hospital administration.

While reporting the events following the 2013 coup in Egypt Al Sharq praised security forces while its rival Al Raya, another Arabic Qatari paper, emphasized the demonstrations by the supporters of the Muslim Brotherhood and ousted President Mohamed Morsi.

References

External links
 

1987 establishments in Qatar
Arabic-language newspapers
Mass media in Doha
Newspapers published in Qatar
Newspapers established in 1987